Chair Beside a Window is the fourth album by avant- folk/ blues singer-songwriter Jandek, and Corwood Industries' first release of 1982 ( 742).

It is the first Jandek album to feature a female vocalist, most likely named Nancy (the song is called "Nancy Sings"); in a letter to Irwin Chusid, Nancy is described as playing an "unaggressive drum stint," and the other female vocalist is referred to as "Nancy's sister Pat."

It is also the first album to reprise the song "European Jewel" after its "incomplete" version abruptly ended Jandek's debut album four years prior.

Track listing

Covers

Adam Stafford and The Death Bridge Convention covered "Nancy Sings" in the album Music in the Mirrabell in 2010.

References

External links 
Seth Tisue's Chair Beside a Window review

Jandek albums
Corwood Industries albums
1982 albums